The 2022 Big Ten Men's Lacrosse Tournament was held from Apr 30 to May 7. All six teams participated in the tournament while the top two teams in the regular season standings received first-round byes. The first round matches were held on the campus of the higher seed teams, and the semifinals and final matches were held at the Capital One Field at Maryland Stadium in College Park, Maryland. The tournament's winner received the Big Ten Conference's automatic bid to the 2022 NCAA Division I Men's Lacrosse Championship. The seeds were determined based on the teams' regular season conference record. Maryland won the tournament, beating Rutgers 15–7.

Regular season standings

Not including Big Ten Tournament and NCAA tournament results

Bracket

Awards

 MVP: Logan Wisnauskas, 5th, A, Maryland
 All-Tournament Team
 Garrett Degnon, Sr., A, Johns Hopkins
 Anthony DeMaio, 5th, M, Maryland
 Keegan Khan, Gr., A, Maryland
 Logan McNaney, Jr., G, Maryland
 Logan Wisnauskas, 5th, A, Maryland
 Jackson Reid, Sr., M, Ohio State
 Skylar Wahlund, Sr., G, Ohio State
 Mitch Bartolo, Sr., A, Rutgers
 Colin Kirst, Sr., G, Rutgers
 Ross Scott, Jr., A, Rutgers

MVP: Logan Wisnauskas, 5th, A, Maryland

References

External links 
 2022 Big Ten Men's Lacrosse Tournament
 Boxscore (Final)
 Boxscore (Semifinal, Rutgers vs. Ohio State)
 Boxscore (Semifinal, Maryland vs. Johns Hopkins)
 Boxscore (First round, Johns Hopkins vs. Penn State)
 Boxscore (First round, Michigan vs. Ohio State)

2022 NCAA Division I men's lacrosse season
Big Ten Conference Men's Lacrosse
Big Ten men's lacrosse tournament